Langkawi Stadium is a stadium in Langkawi, Kedah, Malaysia. It was built by the Langkawi Development Authority LADA for recreational facilities in the area of Langkawi. The stadium is located in the Langkawi Sport Centre. It has 2 parts of roof and the capacity of 10,000.

References 

Football venues in Malaysia
Langkawi
Athletics (track and field) venues in Malaysia
Multi-purpose stadiums in Malaysia
Sports venues in Kedah